Esoteric healing refers to numerous types of alternative medicine which aim to heal disease and disability, using esoteric means, either through faith and human will, or by using pseudoscientific processes. It was first published in the 1950s and was initially inspired by Djwal Khul and Alice Bailey.

Healing 
 
 
 Crystal healing
 Dianetics
 Energy medicine
 Faith healing
 Gifts of healing
 Johrei
 Laying on of hands
 Liu Zi Jue
 Musica universalis
 Prana
 
 Psychic surgery
 
 Qigong
 Quantum healing
 Radionics
 Reiki
 Royal touch
 Therapeutic touch
 ThetaHealing
 Universal Medicine

See also
 Energy (esotericism)
 Folk healer
 Healing revival
 Inner Healing Movement
 Long Healing Prayer
 Quackery
 Quantum mysticism
 Scientific skepticism
 Shamanism
 Traditional medicine
 World Healing Day

References 

Supernatural healing
Pseudoscience